Florian Christian Neuhaus (born 16 March 1997) is a German footballer who plays as a midfielder for Bundesliga club Borussia Mönchengladbach and the Germany national team.

Club career

Early career
Neuhaus was born 40 miles outside of Munich and started his youth career with local club 1860 Munich. In the semi-finals of the German youth league in 2016, Neuhaus scored the winner against Borussia Dortmund in a 2–1 victory, doing so from the halfway line in the 89th minute. The strike was named Goal of the Month by German broadcaster Sportschau.

Borussia Mönchengladbach
After impressing in the 2. Bundesliga in his debut professional season with 1860 Munich, he moved to Borussia Mönchengladbach in summer 2017 on a long-term contract.  He was immediately loaned to Fortuna Düsseldorf for the 2017–18 season, where his six goals and three assists in 27 second-tier matches helped Fortuna clinch the league title and promotion to the top flight.

On 19 November 2019, Mönchengladbach announced that Neuhaus had penned a contract extension with the club lasting until 2024. At the time of signing, Neuhaus had made 50 appearances for 'Die Fohlen' and had contributed five goals and 10 assists in all competitions. He has gone on to play in all but two of Gladbach's Bundesliga outings during the 2018–19 season, and has only missed four league outings during the 2019–20 season, becoming a key part of Marco Rose's squad.

2020–21 season
On 12 September 2020, Neuhaus scored two goals as Gladbach defeated Oberneuland by a score of 8–0 in the first round of the DFB-Pokal.

International career
Neuhaus is a youth international for Germany. He was called up to the senior Germany squad for the UEFA Nations League matches against Spain and Switzerland in September 2020. He made his debut on 7 October 2020, against Turkey in a friendly game, while scoring his first goal as well. On 19 May 2021, he was selected to the squad for the UEFA Euro 2020.

Career statistics

Club

International

As of match played 14 November 2021. Scores and results list Germany's goal tally first.

Honours
Fortuna Düsseldorf
2. Bundesliga: 2017–18

References

External links

Living people
1997 births
People from Landsberg am Lech
Sportspeople from Upper Bavaria
German footballers
Germany youth international footballers
Germany under-21 international footballers
Germany international footballers
Association football midfielders
TSV 1860 Munich II players
TSV 1860 Munich players
2. Bundesliga players
Footballers from Bavaria
Borussia Mönchengladbach players
Fortuna Düsseldorf players
Regionalliga players
Bundesliga players
UEFA Euro 2020 players